Kornfeld is a German surname meaning "cornfield". Notable people with the surname include:

Emma Kornfeld 
New Zealand management consultant 
Artie Kornfeld (born 1942), American musician, record producer and music executive
Eberhard W. Kornfeld (born 1923), Swiss auctioneer, gallerist, author, art dealer and collector
Edmund Kornfeld (1919-2012), American organic chemist
Herbert Kornfeld, fictional contributor to The Onion
Jack Kornfield (born 1945), Buddhist monk
Joseph Saul Kornfeld, U.S. ambassador to Persia
Louis Kornfeld writer of the story behind The Infernal Machine
Paul Kornfeld (playwright) (1889–1942), Czech-born writer
Paul Kornfeld (swimmer), American swimmer
Zach Kornfeld, American comedian, filmmaker and internet personality
Zsigmond Kornfeld (1852–1909), Hungarian banker and baron

See also
Cornfeld
Kornfield
Cornfield (surname)

German-language surnames